Asahi Kokaji (born 6 August 2002) is a Japanese professional footballer who plays as a midfielder for WE League club AC Nagano Parceiro Ladies.

Club career 
Kokaji made her WE League debut on 10 October 2021.

References 

Living people
2002 births
Women's association football midfielders
WE League players
Japanese women's footballers
Association football people from Ishikawa Prefecture
AC Nagano Parceiro Ladies players